René Kolonko (born 18 August 1981) is a German former swimmer, who specialized in breaststroke events. He is a member of the swimming team for SC Riesa an der Elbe in Riesa, and is coached and trained by Uwe Neumann.

Kolonko represented Germany at the 2004 Summer Olympics in Athens, where he competed in the men's 100 m breaststroke. He had just barely advanced into the semifinals, after securing the sixteenth spot from the morning's preliminary heats, clocking at 1:02.09. Kolonko failed to advance into the final, but lowered his Olympic entry time (1:01.88) by six hundredths of a second (0.06), finishing his semifinal run with a time of 1:01.82.

References

1981 births
Living people
German male swimmers
Olympic swimmers of Germany
Swimmers at the 2004 Summer Olympics
German male breaststroke swimmers
Swimmers from Leipzig
20th-century German people
21st-century German people